Transcriptional repressor NF-X1 is a protein that in humans is encoded by the NFX1 gene.

MHC class II gene expression is controlled primarily at the transcriptional level by transcription factors that bind to the X and Y boxes, two highly conserved elements in the proximal promoter of MHC class II genes. The protein encoded by this gene is a transcriptional repressor capable of binding to the conserved X box motif of HLA-DRA and other MHC class II genes in vitro. The protein may play a role in regulating the duration of an inflammatory response by limiting the period in which class II MHC molecules are induced by IFN-γ. Three alternative splice variants, each of which encodes a different isoform, have been identified.

References

Further reading

External links 
 

Transcription factors